Gurney Plaza() is a shopping mall in George Town, Penang, Malaysia. Located at Gurney Drive, it was opened in November 2001 and is now managed by CapitaMalls Asia, a subsidiary of the Singapore-based CapitaLand. Its main anchor tenant is Parkson, while Golden Screen Cinemas operates the largest multiplex in northern Malaysia within the top floor of the mall. 

Gurney Plaza contains 380 shop lots spread out over nine floors which include 2 basement car park and 2 multi-storey car park. The mall has attracted various established international brands, making it one of the major retail and entertainment centres within Penang.

Retail outlets 
The mall consists of nine retail floors and 879,930 sq ft of net lettable area, making it the second largest shopping mall in Penang, after Queensbay Mall. Aside from Parkson, its main anchor tenant, Gurney Plaza contains a wide variety of well-known international brands. These include book stores like MPH and Popular, fashion names such as Marks & Spencer, British India, Armani, Guess, Calvin Klein, Timberland, Giordano, Body Glove and Levi's, accessory firms such as Omega, Rado, Montblanc, Bell & Ross, Mido and Swarovski, and the supermarket chain Mercato (formerly Cold Storage).

In addition, several restaurants, cafes and food stalls can be found inside Gurney Plaza. Some of its restaurants are notably arranged along an outdoor alfresco space.

Entertainment 
Gurney Plaza has a variety of entertainment options. The most well-known of all is the Golden Screen Cinemas at the top floor, with 12 cineplexes. Opened in 2004, it is Golden Screen Cinemas' largest multiplex within northern Malaysia.

A karaoke joint operated by Red Box is also located at the top floor, adjacent to the aforementioned cinema. Other options include a rock-climbing gym (Project Rock Gurney) and a Toys "R" Us store.

See also 
 List of shopping malls in Malaysia

References

External links

 CapitaLand Website
 Gurney Plaza Website

Shopping malls in Penang
Shopping malls established in 2001
Buildings and structures in George Town, Penang
2001 establishments in Malaysia